Amanda Mildred Carr (born June 24, 1990) is a Thai BMX cyclist.

Early life
Carr started BMX when she was 5, after being convinced by her cousins. Carr attended Charlotte High School in Punta Gorda, Florida During high school she earned an incredible 17 varsity letters in sports such as golf, track and field, weight lifting and soccer, all while maintaining a 3.84 GPA. Carr came in 4th place in the 139lb weight class at the Florida HS AA State Championships in weightlifting with a 150 lb. Bench Press and a 155 lb. Clean & Jerk. Her track and field and soccer skills led to additional opportunities after high school. In 2008, she was a member of the North Carolina State University Women's Soccer team; however she decided to transfer to Florida State University in the spring of 2009. At FSU, taking advantage of her diverse athletic background, Amanda began preparing to compete with the track and field team in the Heptathlon.

Personal life 
Carr holds dual US and Thai citizenship. She has an American father and a Thai mother from Udon Thani. Her father is a lawyer and a former US Air Force member. After training under USA Cycling for several years, Carr chose to change her country designation to compete for Thailand in BMX. Carr is a fluent Thai Isan speaker of the North Eastern dialect of Thailand, as her mother taught her the Thai Isan Dialect when she was little, they spoke the Thai North Eastern Dialect.

Royal decoration 
 2015 –  Gold Medalist (Sixth Class) of The Most Admirable Order of the Direkgunabhorn

References

External links 
 Amanda Carr at USA BMX
 
 
 

1990 births
Living people
BMX riders
Amanda Carr
American female cyclists
Amanda Carr
Cyclists at the 2016 Summer Olympics
Pan American Games competitors for the United States
Cyclists at the 2011 Pan American Games
Asian Games medalists in cycling
Amanda Carr
Cyclists at the 2014 Asian Games
Medalists at the 2014 Asian Games
Charlotte High School (Punta Gorda, Florida) alumni
Cyclists from Florida
American sportspeople of Thai descent
Amanda Carr
People from Punta Gorda, Florida